The Merck family is a German family of industrialists and bankers, known for establishing the world's oldest pharmaceutical company Merck, its American former subsidiary Merck & Co. (MSD), which is now an independent company, as well as the Hamburg merchant bank H. J. Merck & Co. The family still owns the majority of the pharmaceutical company Merck.

History

The family first appeared in Hammelburg in the 15th century. The family has a long history in pharmacy going back to the 17th century. In 1668 Friedrich Jacob Merck purchased the second town pharmacy in Darmstadt, known as the Engel-Apotheke or Angel Pharmacy, which would evolve into the major company Merck, the world's oldest operating pharmaceutical and chemical company. When Friedrich died, the pharmacy was passed on to his nephew and it has been owned by the family ever since. The sixth person in this series of pharmacists was Heinrich Emanuel Merck who in 1827 established the chemical-pharmaceutical factory in Darmstadt, which laid the foundations for the company's research operations and growth from a pharmacy to a major company in the 19th century. The Merck family controls a majority of 70.3% of the company's shares. An American former subsidiary of the Merck company, Merck & Co. (MSD), was also established by the Merck family and still carries the family's name, but, unlike its former parent company, is no longer owned by the Merck family, since it was nationalized by the American government in 1917 because of World War I and the stock was bought back by George F. Merck in 1919. Merck & Co. was also led by family member George W. Merck (son of George F. Merck) from 1925 until 1950.

A branch of the family descended from Heinrich Johann Merck (1770–1853) belonged to Hamburg's ruling class of Hanseatic merchants. His family founded the merchant bank H. J. Merck & Co. and several family members served as senators in Hamburg, while his son Carl Merck (1809–1880) was Syndicus (foreign affairs head) of Hamburg 1847–1880. Another son, the merchant banker Ernst Merck, who had been the Austrian consul-general in Hamburg, was ennobled by the Austrian emperor Franz Joseph I in 1860 and received the title of Baron.

Family members

Friedrich Jacob Merck, apothecary in Schweinfurt, Germany, who in 1668 bought the "Engel-Apotheke" (Angel Pharmacy) in Darmstadt.
Heinrich Emanuel Merck (1794–1855), grandson of Johann Heinrich Merck (1741–1791). Emmanuel took over the pharmacy in 1816.
George W. Merck, president of Merck & Co. in the US from 1925 to 1950

External links
2012 The IMD-Lombard Odier Global Family Business Award

Merck Group
Merck & Co.
Businesspeople in the pharmaceutical industry
German noble families
Banking families
Grand burghers of Hamburg
Business families
History of banking
German bankers
Hanseatic families